Lê Quan Ninh (born Paris, 1961) is a French percussionist active in contemporary music and free improvisation.

He began studying piano at the age of 7, but turned towards percussion as a teenager.  When he was 16,  he entered the National Conservatory in Versailles. During this time he discovered free jazz.  After graduating, he taught percussion for 3 years at a conservatory in Bondy, France while performing with contemporary music, dance, and theater groups often using self-taught techniques and found objects in his improvisation.

In the 1980s Ninh collaborated with Daunik Lazro, Michel Doneda, Serge Pey, Peter Kowald, Butch Morris, and  Nicolas Peskine's  Compagnie du Hasard.

In 1992 Ninh founded the Association La Flibuste which organized and presented improvisational artistic events across genres. 

External links
Homepage
Biography and list of releases
FMP releases 
Le Ventre Négatif album review

1961 births
Living people
French jazz musicians
Free improvisation
French percussionists